Nancy Archer may refer to:

Nancy Fowler Archer, a character from the 1958 film Attack of the 50 Foot Woman
Nancy Cobb Archer, a character in the 1993 film Attack of the 50 Ft. Woman